Super Dragon Ball Heroes is a Japanese original net animation and promotional anime series for the card and video games of the same name. Similar to Dragon Ball GT, it is a manga-inspired installment of the Dragon Ball media franchise, created by Toei Animation instead of franchise creator Akira Toriyama. The opening theme songs for the season are "Universe Mission Series Theme Song" (episodes 1-20), "Big Bang Mission Series Theme Song" (episodes 21-28 and 30-40), and "Fight Song" (episode 29), all the theme songs are performed by Dragon Soul which is composed of Takayoshi Tanimoto, Mayumi Gojo and YOFFY. It premiered on July 1, 2018. Super Dragon Ball Heroes is presented with several alternate scenarios and possible outcomes within the franchise.

Series overview

Episode list

Universe Mission

Prison Planet Arc (2018)

Universal Conflict Arc (2019–20)

Special Arc I (2020)

Big Bang Mission

Universe Creation Arc (2020–21)

Special Arc II (2020)

Universe Creation Arc (cont.) (2020–21)

New Space-Time War Arc (2021)

Ultra God Mission

Supreme Kai of Time Arc (2022–Current)

Notes

References

External links
 Universe Mission official website (in Japanese)
 Big Bang Mission official website (in Japanese)
 Ultra God Mission official website (in Japanese)

Heroes